Kjell Westö (born 6 August 1961 in Helsinki, Finland) is a Finnish author and journalist. Westö writes in Swedish. Best known for his epic novels set in Helsinki, he has also written short stories, poetry, essays and newspaper columns.

Biography 

Kjell Westö made his literary debut as a poet in 1986. Three years later his first volume of prose,  (Rasch and Other Stories), was published. It was a critical success and was nominated for the prestigious Finlandia Prize. Westö's earliest works provided glimpses of his future strengths, particularly an assured command of dialogue, setting and mood.

Kjell Westö's first novel, Drakarna över Helsingfors (Kites over Helsinki, 1996), made a huge impact on Swedish- and Finnish-speaking audiences in Finland. His fourth novel, Där vi en gång gått (Where We Once Walked, 2006), secured Kjell Westö's status as an author for all of Finland and won him the Finlandia Prize. Both its Swedish and Finnish editions were commercial successes in Finland and the novel was also Westö's breakthrough in Sweden. A stage adaptation was performed at Helsinki City Theatre, and the story was made into a film and TV series.

In his depictions of different eras, Kjell Westö portrays fragile, vulnerable individuals and the impact the big historical events have on them. This practice continues in his fifth novel,  (Do Not Go Alone Into the Night, 2009), and his sixth, Hägring 38 (Mirage 38, 2013). Like Westö's previous works,  is a Helsinki novel, a portrait of an era and of a social class. It was nominated for the Finlandia Prize and Sweden's August Prize, and was awarded the 2014 Nordic Council Literature Prize and the Swedish Radio Novel Prize.

Today, Kjell Westö's works have been translated into over 20 languages, and he is a seven-time recipient of awards from the Society of Swedish Literature in Finland.  (The Sulphur-Yellow Sky) is his seventh novel. It was published in 2017 in Swedish, Finnish, Norwegian and Danish, with French, German and Dutch translation rights also sold; a film based on the novel was released in 2021.

In 2020 Westö's eighth novel Tritonus was published.

Writing style

Westö has said that the essence of his writing is a never-ending interest in the enigma of being human and an irrepressible desire to find out why we are the way we are and why we do the things we do. He prefers to explore the past as well as the present, portraying different types of people with contrasting viewpoints and circumstances. On one occasion he explained his reason for writing thus: "Because strangers turn up in my head uninvited and start speaking and doing things, and they want to get out."

Bibliography 
 Tango orange (1986)
  (1988)
  (1989; under the pseudonym Anders Hed)
  (1989)
  (1992)
  (1996)
  (1998; with Kristoffer Albrecht)
  (2000)
  (2002)
  (2004)
 Där vi en gång gått (lit. 'Where We Once Went', novel, 2006)
  (2009)
  (2011)
 Mirage 38 (novel, 2013)
  (2017)
  2020

Awards 
Kjell Westö has received several prestigious awards and acknowledgements. He has been nominated for the Finlandia Prize in 1989, 2000, 2002 and 2013 (Hägring 38).

Westö has also been nominated for the Nordic Council Literature Prize in 2001 and 2003. The Society of Swedish Literature in Finland has awarded Westö in 1987, 1990, 1997, 2001, 2007, 2010 and 2014.

References

External links
 kjellwesto.com
 Kjell Westö Schildts & Söderströms
 Kjell Westö Albert Bonniers förlag
 Kjell Westö Otava

1961 births
Living people
Writers from Helsinki
Finnish writers in Swedish
Finnish poets in Swedish
Finlandia Prize winners
Swedish-speaking Finns